Pangali is a 1992 Indian Tamil-language action comedy film starring Sathyaraj and Bhanupriya, Goundamani. The film stars Sathyaraj enacting dual role. It was released on 12 September 2022.

Plot

Cast 

 Sathyaraj as Sakthivel & Durai
 Banupriya as Saithai Tamilarasi
 Manorama as Durai's mother
 Goundamani as Kuyilkunju
 Napoleon
 Mansoor Ali Khan
 Vijayakumar
 Nadia Ali
 Shanmugasundaram
 Sathyapriya
 Vennira Aadai Moorthy
 Delhi Ganesh
 Idichapuli Selvaraj
 Bayilvan Ranganathan
 Silk Smitha as item number
 Disco Shanti as item number

Soundtrack 
Soundtrack was composed by Ilaiyaraaja.

Critical reception 
The Indian Express wrote "Anu Mohan with his weak and insipid dialogues, K. Subash with his weak screenplay and callous treatment join together in a conspiracy to take the audience for long ride". New Straits Times wrote "This movie will satisfy Sathyaraj fans looking for fights, laughs and romance".

References

External links 
 

1990s Tamil-language films
1992 action comedy films
1992 films
Films directed by K. Subash
Films scored by Ilaiyaraaja
Indian action comedy films